Philip Bardowell was born in Kingston, Jamaica W.I., and raised in southern California, singer/songwriter Philip Bardowell was introduced to music at an early age when he began piano lessons at the age of five. His influences include: The Beatles, Elton John, Led Zeppelin, Stevie Wonder, The Eagles, Queen, Earth Wind And Fire and Bob Marley.

By the age of twelve, he taught himself how to play guitar and formed his first band. At age 20, Philip worked on the road backing the Surf music genre duo, Jan and Dean as their bassist and backup vocalist. Consequently, Mike Love of The Beach Boys, hired Philip to serve as lead guitarist and vocalist in his Endless Summer Beach Band. In 1993, Philip teamed up with Peter Criss and Ace Frehley of KISS fronting Peter's band "CRISS" as lead singer and rhythm guitarist.

It was after serving this role for two years that Philip discovered that he felt a void just singing and playing music for the sole purpose of entertainment and began attending Saddleback Church in Orange County, CA in search of a new purpose for his life. After a while, he was asked to audition for the praise team, and by the grace of God, he was asked to join the praise team and began serving regularly as a vocalist and musician. This led to his acceptance of Jesus Christ as his personal Savior. "I came to Christ by worshipping Him through song. He entered my heart through my praise and worship of Him and my life was changed forever. Philip had found a new passion in serving The Lord, but continued in his career as a professional musician

Philip befriended Beach Boy, Carl Wilson, when Carl heard him sing at a birthday party for Beach Boy frontman, Mike Love. Carl called on Philip to sing his parts as a member of the Beach Boys touring band when he became stricken with cancer. After Carl's passing in 1998, Philip continued in his role as lead guitarist and vocalist for the Beach Boys until 2001 when he left the band to write and record his own music and pursue other endeavors.

Philip's first solo album, "In A Perfect World…" was released later that year and was met with success and great reviews. It immediately got Philip's music noticed by the likes of radio personalities Mark and Brian of 95.5 KLOS in Los Angeles who invited Philip with his newly formed band, Day After Rain, to play a one-hour set live on-air as the winner of the Mark And Brian Best Unsigned Artist competition. Philip and his band's performance on that show prompted T.V. personality, Wayne Brady to call in and invite the band to appear on the Wayne Brady Show.

Philip is also known for his role as lead vocalist in the Frontline Records Christian Rock band, MAGDALEN together with former House Of Lords members Chuck Wright, Lanny Cordola and Ken Mary. He has been a part of many albums in the Contemporary Christian genre appearing on albums for Maranatha Records, Promise Keepers and Reggae Worship volumes 1 and 2 for Frontline Records.

Currently, Philip is working on another record for Naples, Italy-based Frontiers Records, where he released his first solo album on the label, In The Cut, in 2005. His most recent work is collaboration with recording artist, Bruce Turgon (Foreigner, Shadowking). Philip continues to write and record music as he serves as worship leader in Southern California. Hardline recorded a cover of the song "Never Too Late For Love" for the 2012 album Danger Zone.

External links
 Philip Bardowell

Living people
Year of birth missing (living people)
Jamaican emigrants to the United States
The Beach Boys backing band members
Musicians from Kingston, Jamaica